Dorcas Ewokolo Idowu (born  27 August 1903) was a Cameroonian politician. She was the first woman to sit in the Southern Cameroons House of Assembly, and the first female parliamentarian in what is now Cameroon.

Biography
Idowu was born in 1903, the daughter of Joseph Lifanjo Ekema. She married Thomas Faguma Idowu and worked as a teacher at the government school in Buea.

A member of the Kamerun National Congress, Idowu was appointed to the Southern Cameroons House of Assembly in July 1955 as a member representing women's interests, becoming the first female parliamentarian in Cameroon. She remained a member until 1959.

References

1903 births
Cameroonian educators
20th-century Cameroonian women politicians
20th-century Cameroonian politicians
Members of the Southern Cameroons House of Assembly
Kamerun National Congress politicians
Date of death unknown